ONE (the N-Gage 2.0 version was previously known under the title ONE - Who's Next?) is a fighting game for the N-Gage and N-Gage 2.0. It was developed by Spanish studio Digital Legends and published by Nokia.

Reception 

The game received "average" reviews according to the review aggregation website Metacritic.

References

External links 
 
 ONE (N-Gage handheld game console version) game page at N-Gage.com
 ONE (N-Gage mobile gaming service version) game page at N-Gage.com
 
 Digital Legends Entertainment website

2005 video games
N-Gage games
N-Gage service games
Fighting games
Video games developed in Spain
Nokia games
Multiplayer and single-player video games